William Sperry Beinecke (May 22, 1914 – April 8, 2018) was an American philanthropist and businessman.

Career and philanthropy
Beinecke studied at Westminster School, Pingry School,  graduated from Yale University in 1936 and Columbia Law School in 1940. He served in the U.S. Navy during the Second World War, retiring with the rank of Lieutenant Commander.

In 1952 he joined Sperry & Hutchinson, the company founded by his great-uncle Thomas Sperry, which was best known for its S&H Green Stamps, and served as chairman and CEO before his retirement in 1980.

He was the principal benefactor of the Yale Golf Course at Yale University and the William Miller Sperry Observatory at Union County College in Cranford, New Jersey. He was a donor to Yale University's Beinecke Rare Book & Manuscript Library and also founded the Central Park Conservancy.

He published his memoirs in 2000.

Family
Bill Beinecke was the son of Frederick W. Beinecke and Carrie Regina Sperry Beinecke (the daughter of William Miller Sperry) and lived in Cranford, New Jersey, until the age of 11.

Beinecke had four children, including the environmentalist Frances Beinecke.  He turned 100 in May 2014.

Death
William Beinecke died on April 8, 2018 at the age of 103.

References

1914 births
2018 deaths
American centenarians
Men centenarians
Central Park
Parks in Union County, New Jersey
People from Cranford, New Jersey
Benefactors of Yale University
Philanthropists from New Jersey
Yale University alumni
Columbia Law School alumni
20th-century American philanthropists